Plombières-les-Bains is a commune in the Vosges department in Grand Est in eastern France. It was the seat of the former canton of Plombières-les-Bains.

Les bains refers to the hot springs in the area, whose properties were first discovered by the Romans.  In succeeding centuries, its baths were visited by Montaigne, Voltaire, the Dukes of Guise, the Dukes of Lorraine, Beaumarchais, Napoleon Bonaparte, Joséphine de Beauharnais, Napoléon III, Berlioz, Lamartine and Alfred de Musset. It is still a spa town with many buildings from the Second French Empire including the Church Saint Amé built with the financial support of Napoléon III.

Plombières Agreement
The "Pavilion of the Princes" at Plombières, was renamed following the meeting on 21 July 1858 between Napoleon III and Camillo Benso, Count of Cavour, who secretly negotiated the “Plombières Agreement” as they sat alone together in a small horse-drawn carriage slowly progressing round and round the town. This accord granted French aid to the cause of Piedmont-Sardinia against the Austrian Empire in return for the territories of Savoy and Nice, which thereafter became French.

Plombieres ice cream

In Russia, the highest of the state standard quality categories of ice cream, containing at least 12% butterfat, is known as "plombir" (пломбир), a slight distortion of the pronunciation of "Plombières" in Russian.  According to Dmitry Ushakov's Explanatory Dictionary of the Russian Language and Max Vasmer's authoritative "Etymological dictionary of the Russian language", the French dessert plombieres is named after Plombières, whose name has been associated with extravagant frozen desserts since the late 19th century. But the name of the molded French sweet is probably taken from the mold.

See also
Communes of the Vosges department

References

External links

  Office du tourisme des Vosges méridionales
  Official site
  Association "Le Marché de Noël"
  Compagnie Thermale de Plombières-les-Bains

Communes of Vosges (department)
Spa towns in France